Bahadurpur, also called Bahadurpur Da Jayas, is a village and corresponding community development block in Tiloi tehsil of Rae Bareli district, Uttar Pradesh, India. It is located 3 km from the town of Jais. As of 2011, its population is 17,595, in 2,951 households. The main staple foods are wheat and rice.

The 1961 census recorded Bahadurpur as comprising 4 hamlets, with a total population of 539 people (315 male and 224 female), in 135 households and 133 physical houses.
  The area of the village was given as 592 acres.

The 1981 census recorded Bahadurpur as having a population of 969 people, in 332 households, and having an area of 62.32 hectares.

Villages
Bahadurpur CD block has the following 42 villages:

References

Villages in Raebareli district